Echinoida is an order of sea urchins in the class Echinoidea. They are distinguished from other sea urchins by simultaneously possessing both an un-sculpted test and a feeding lantern with large plates fused across the top of each pyramid.

Taxonomy
Order Echinoida
 family Echinidae Gray, 1825
 family Echinometridae Gray, 1825
 family Parasaleniidae
 family Strongylocentrotidae Gregory, 1900

See also
Colobocentrotus atratus - Shingle urchin
Echinus acutus - White sea urchin
Echinus esculentus - Common sea urchin
Echinus tylodes
Evechinus chloroticus - New Zealand sea urchin
Heterocentrotus mammillatus - Red pencil urchin
Heterocentrotus trigonarius - Slate pencil urchin
Loxechinus albus - Chilean sea urchin

References
 
 

 
Extant Late Cretaceous first appearances